Matthew Elliot Orr Wing Kai (born 1 January 1997) is a Hong Kong professional footballer of partial New Zealand descent who currently plays for China League One club Guangxi Pingguo Haliao.

Amateur career
Orr joined Kitchee's academy at 11 years old. He enrolled into the IMG Academy three years later in order to further his football education, although he continued to return to Hong Kong every summer to train with Kitchee.

In 2016, Orr chose to play collegiately for San Francisco where he was named to the WCC All-Freshman team. In 2017, he was an integral part of the Dons team that won the West Coast Conference. 

In January 2019, he transferred to Syracuse for his senior season.

Professional career

Kitchee
On 3 July 2019, Kitchee announced an agreement for Orr to join in the second-half of the season. On 27 December 2019, Orr returned to Hong Kong, signing a contract with his boyhood club Kitchee. 

He made his professional debut on 11 February 2020 in a Sapling Cup match against Rangers. Matthew scored his first Hong Kong Premier League goal in a 2–2 draw against Lee Man on 22 November 2020.

On 20 August 2022, Orr left Kitchee.

Guangxi Pingguo Haliao

After two years with Kitchee, Orr joined China League One club Guangxi Pingguo Haliao.

International career
Orr first represented Hong Kong as a 12 year old with the U13 team. He received his first call up to the U23 squad for the Asian Games. 

In 2019, Orr was named to the Hong Kong squad for the 2019 Guangdong–Hong Kong Cup where he scored a goal in the second leg and was later sent off for violent conduct.

In 2020, Orr was named to the U23 squad that participated in the AFC U-23 Championship Qualifiers held in Ulaanbaatar, Mongolia. Orr started all three games notching an assist.

After an impressive performance during the 2020–21 season of the HKPL, Orr was named within the 25-man squad for the 2022 World Cup qualifying fixtures against Iran, Iraq and Bahrain. He made his international debut against Iran on 3 June 2021, where he scored his first goal for the Hong Kong national team.

Personal life
Orr was born and raised in Hong Kong by a New Zealand father (Andrew Orr) and a Chinese mother (Janice Chin). He was a graduate of Canadian International School. He also holds New Zealand passport.

Career statistics

Club

Notes

International

International goals

Honours

Kitchee
 Hong Kong Premier League: 2019–20, 2020–21
 Hong Kong Sapling Cup: 2019–20

Hong Kong
 Guangdong-Hong Kong Cup: 2019

References

External links
 
 Profile at HKFA
 

 
1997 births
Living people
Hong Kong footballers
Hong Kong expatriate footballers
Hong Kong international footballers
New Zealand association footballers
Hong Kong people of New Zealand descent
New Zealand people of Hong Kong descent
Association football forwards
Association football midfielders
Hong Kong Premier League players
China League One players
Kitchee SC players
Expatriate soccer players in the United States
Expatriate footballers in China
Footballers at the 2018 Asian Games
Asian Games competitors for Hong Kong
San Francisco Dons men's soccer players
Syracuse Orange men's soccer players